Ferriby Sluice is a hamlet situated near the lock complex on the Humber and River Ancholme, Lincolnshire, England.
It is now part of the village of South Ferriby  but once stood alone in its own right.   It is situated west of South Ferriby, physically separated from the bulk of the village, and once was the point of departure for the packet boats that used to ply the Humber.

References

External links

Villages in Lincolnshire
Borough of North Lincolnshire